Aston, Cote, Shifford and Chimney is a civil parish in the West Oxfordshire district of Oxfordshire in England. As the name suggests, the parish includes the villages of Aston and Cote, and the hamlets of Shifford and Chimney.  The southern border of the parish is the River Thames. The 2011 Census recorded the parish's population as 1,374.

History 
Until the 19th century all four places were townships in the ancient parish of Bampton.  In 1866 the three civil parishes of Aston and Cote, Chimney and Shifford were separated from Bampton.  In 1931 Aston and Cote and Chimney were united to form the civil parish of Aston Bampton, which was merged with Shifford in 1954 to form the parish of Aston Bampton and Shifford.  The parish was later renamed Aston, Cote, Shifford and Chimney.

Locations
Aston 
Cote 
Chimney 
Shifford

References

External links
Community website

Civil parishes in Oxfordshire
West Oxfordshire District